Stella is a British comedy-drama set in the Welsh valleys that aired on Sky One from 2012 to 2017. It was created by David Peet and Ruth Jones, who plays the role of the titular character and appears alongside a cast ensemble which includes Patrick Baladi. The sixth and final series premiered on 13 September 2017 and concluded with a 70-minute finale on 18 October 2017. Various celebrities make guest cameos, with former Wales rugby union international Scott Quinnell making the most appearances.

Plot 
Stella focuses on the ups and downs in the life of a struggling mother of three living in the Welsh town of Pontyberry, earning a living doing the laundry and ironing for the locals. Stella’s eldest son, Luke, is serving a prison sentence for joyriding; daughter, Emma, completely besotted with boyfriend Sunil, wants to leave school without doing her exams; and youngest, Ben, is working on his family tree, which brings back a familiar face from Stella’s past and sends shockwaves throughout the valley.

Along for the bumpy ride are Stella’s best friend Paula, a functioning alcoholic funeral director married to Stella’s brother Dai, an ex-serviceman injured on duty; Stella’s dim, but well-meaning ex-husband Karl, father to Emma and Ben and now with the much-younger Nadine; and lollipop man and youth rugby coach Alan, Stella’s old schoolfriend who has had unrequited love for her since their schooldays.

Episodes

Cast

Key Cast

Supporting cast

Special guests
Many celebrities appeared in the series as themselves:

Ashley Banjo
Joe Calzaghe
Colin Charvis
Keith Chegwin
Rylan Clark-Neal
Nicky Clarke
Gino D'Acampo
Andy Fairweather Low
Warren Gatland
Russell Grant
Eamonn Holmes
Colin Jackson
Gethin Jones
Neil Kinnock
Debbie McGee
Gillian McKeith
Only Men Aloud
Damien O'Kane
Mike Phillips
Robert Plant
Graham Price
Scott Quinnell
Tim Rhys-Evans
Jonathan Ross
Kate Rusby
Andrew Stone
Gareth Thomas
Shane Williams

DVD releases

Filming
The series was largely filmed in Ferndale in the Rhondda Valley in Wales.

References

External links

2010s British comedy-drama television series
2012 British television series debuts
2017 British television series endings
British comedy-drama television shows
Sky UK original programming
Television shows set in Wales
English-language television shows